Atethmia algirica is a moth of the family Noctuidae. It is found in South-Western Europe and Algeria.

External links
Fauna Europaea
Lepiforum.de

Cuculliinae
Moths of Africa
Moths of Europe
Moths described in 1917